Silivri Kalepark is an urban public park situated inside the historic castle in Silivri district of Istanbul Province, Turkey. Owned by the local municipality, it was opened in 2020 after restoration works. It contains an open-air museum exhibiting stone artifacts found in and around the town.

The park is situated inside the historic castle located on the top of a hill at the seaside, a -high cliff. The castle is dated to the 3rd century AD while mosdt of the remains are from the 9th and 12th century. The park was opened after restoration works by the local municipality on 30 August 2020. The open-air museum features around 150 stone artifacts from the Roman, Byzantine and Ottoman periods found in and around Silivri. There is an open-air cafe and coffeehouse inside the park.

References

Gallery
Some exhibits of the open-air museum in the Silivri Kalepark:

Castles in Istanbul Province
Open-air museums in Turkey
Parks in Istanbul
Silivri
2020 establishments in Turkey
Museums established in 2020